Edmund James Burke Roche, 5th Baron Fermoy (20 March 1939 – 19 August 1984), was a British businessman who held a title in the Peerage of Ireland. He was the maternal uncle of Diana, Princess of Wales.

Early life and education
He was born on 20 March 1939, the only son and youngest child of Maurice Roche, 4th Baron Fermoy, and his wife, Ruth Sylvia Gill, youngest daughter of William Smith Gill. His father died in 1955.

He was a graduate of Eton and the Royal Military Academy Sandhurst.

Career
He became the 5th Baron Fermoy in 1955 when his father died. He was an elected member of Newbury District Council between 1976 and 1979. He was chairman of Eddington Bindery Ltd, based at the Fermoy family home near Hungerford. He was also a steeplechase jockey.

Marriage and children
He was married to Lavinia Frances Elizabeth Pitman (born 1941), daughter of John Pitman (a descendant of Sir Isaac Pitman) and Elizabeth Donaldson.

They had four children:
The Hon. Frances Caroline Burke Roche (born 31 March 1965), married Peter Stanley in 1990. They have three children:
Richard Hugh Edward Stanley (born 1 May 1993)
Portia Ruth Isobel Stanley (born 19 April 1995)
Algernon Edmond Stanley (born 8 March 1999)
The Hon. Elizabeth Burke Roche (27 March 1966 – 2 April 1966)
Maurice Burke Roche, 6th Baron Fermoy (born 11 October 1967), married Tessa Kayll on 26 March 1998. They have two daughters.
The Hon. Edmund Hugh Burke Roche (born 5 February 1972), married Phillipa Katie Victoria Long in 2004. They have three children:
Rosie Jeanne Roche (born 21 June 2005)
Archie Edmund Roche (born 5 October 2007)
Agatha Frances Roche (born 15 October 2009)

Death
After suffering from depression for a long period of time, he committed suicide by gunshot at his home, Eddington House, in Hungerford on 19 August 1984. He was 45.

In 1995, Fermoy's widow, Lavinia Fermoy, married Nigel Edward Corbally Stourton, a grandson of Alfred Stourton, 23rd Baron Mowbray.

Royal connections
Lord Fermoy and his family have close connections to the British royal family. His mother was a longstanding member of Queen Elizabeth The Queen Mother's household. His sister Frances was the mother of Lady Diana Spencer. As the bride's maternal uncle, Lord Fermoy attended her wedding to the Prince of Wales in 1981.

References

1939 births
1984 deaths
1984 suicides
People educated at Eton College
Graduates of the Royal Military Academy Sandhurst
Barons Fermoy
Edmund
English people of Irish descent
English people of American descent
British politicians who committed suicide
Royal Horse Guards officers
Suicides by firearm in England